India has historically and largely not supported sanctions imposed by individual countries. The Government of India has largely supported United Nations sanctions. India has also been warned with sanctions, imposed with them, and has also imposed and threatened its own.

Sanctions imposed by India

Countries

Sanctions against India

References

International sanctions
Sanctions